Bosnian-gauge railways are railways with track gauge of . These were found extensively in the former Austro-Hungarian Empire as a standardised form of narrow gauge. The name is also used for lines of the same gauge outside Bosnia, for example in Austria.

History

It was completed in 1879, using the  temporary tracks and rolling stock used during the construction of the recently finished  Temesvár–Orsova line. The Zenica–Sarajevo extension opened in 1882, with a loading gauge the same as that used on  gauge railways, which was thought to be sufficient for general traffic including passenger services.

The Brod–Zenica–Sarajevo Bosna Bahn provided the basis for the narrow-gauge railway network which was later established in Bosnia-Herzegovina. In barely two decades a national  network was built. By the 1890s this stretched through Mostar to the Dalmatian border at Metkovic, and to Gruž, a suburb of Dubrovnik, on the coast of the Adriatic Sea. This narrow gauge main line carried much heavier traffic than many of the minor  main lines across the Austro-Hungarian Empire. At the time of their introduction, the Bosnia-Herzegovian National Railways'  express locomotives of 1894-96 were the fastest narrow gauge locomotives in Europe, with a  permitted top speed.

The establishment of the fast-growing network, whose length by the start of the 20th centuries exceeded  making it the once largest interconnected narrow gauge network in Europe, secured a high reputation for the Monarchy's engineering corps amongst international professional circles.

It was the success of the Bosnian narrow gauge net which gave impetus after the turn of the century to the large-scale building of  gauge lines across other territories of the Monarchy. The technical solutions pioneered there were used later on all the narrow-gauge railways of Austria-Hungary.

Railways

See also

 List of town tramway systems in Croatia
 List of track gauges
 Sarajevo Tramway

References

External links
 History of Bosnian railways

Track gauges by name
 
Transport in Austria-Hungary
Rail transport in Yugoslavia